Talara is a province in the Piura Region, Peru. It is bordered by the Pacific Ocean on the west, the Paita Province on the south, the Sullana Province on the east and the Tumbes Region's Contralmirante Villar Province on the north. Its capital is the major port city of Talara. It also contains the beach resort of Máncora. The province was created by the President Manuel A. Odría in 1956.

Attractions
The province has tourist attractions such as the Máncora beach resort, Cabo Blanco beach, Punta Balcones, Pariñas Forest, Amotape mountains, a whale fossils deposit, Plataforma del Zócalo Continental, Punta Arenas Houses, Talara Refinery and the Talara Civic Centre. Talara had the greatest reserve of oil in all Peru.

Punta Pariñas, the westernmost point in mainland South America, is located in the province's La Brea District.

Climate

Political division
Talara Province is divided into six districts (singular: distrito), each of which is headed by a mayor (alcalde):
 El Alto
 La Brea
 Lobitos
 Los Organos
 Máncora
 Pariñas

Transportation
It is linked to the rest of the country by various highways and the Cap. FAP Víctor Montes Arias Airport.

History

External links
 Municipality of Talara (in Spanish)

Provinces of the Piura Region